Amoi Technology Co., Ltd. is a Chinese electronics company based in Xiamen, Fujian. It is a mobile service provider which integrates manufacturing, research and development, and sales of mobile communication devices.

History
Amoi was established in 1997, with the original name of Amoisonic. Amoi now has a staff of more than 6000 and total assets of RMB 3.25 billion. Its English company name is derived from Amoy, the old name for Xiamen, from which the company originates.

Research and Development
Amoi Shanghai Institution, Amoi Research Center.

Products
Amoi manufactures a diverse range of consumer electronics, including mobile phones and LCD televisions, for sale both domestically and internationally.

Amoi also manufactures the 3 Skypephone mobile phone along with the INQ Phone, the social networking phone exclusive to 3 Skypephone.

Sponsorships
China women's national volleyball team
Xiamen International Marathon

External links
Amoi official website 
Amoi official website 
Amoi USB Drivers

Manufacturing companies based in Xiamen
Electronics companies of China
Privately held companies of China
Manufacturing companies established in 1997
Mobile phone companies of China
Mobile phone manufacturers
Telecommunication equipment companies of China
Chinese brands